Bernard Joseph White (born April 6, 1947) is president emeritus of the University of Illinois and professor emeritus of business at the University of Illinois at Urbana–Champaign. He is dean emeritus of the Stephen M. Ross School of Business and professor emeritus of business administration at the University of Michigan, where he also served as interim president, and Wilbur K. Pierpont Collegiate Professor of Leadership in Management Education. He is the author of The Nature of Leadership  and Boards That Excel: Candid Insights and Practical Advice for Directors. Boards That Excel was named Governance Book of the Year for 2014 by Directors and Boards.

Education 
White graduated magna cum laude from the Georgetown University School of Foreign Service in 1969. He then earned an MBA with distinction from Harvard Business School and a doctorate in business administration from the University of Michigan.

Career summary 
White began his faculty career at Michigan in 1975.  He served from 1981–1987 as an officer of Cummins in Columbus, Indiana, first as vice president for management development and then as vice president for personnel and public affairs. He returned to the University of Michigan in 1987 and was appointed dean of the business school in 1991. He was appointed Wilbur K. Pierpont Collegiate Professor of Leadership in Management Education and served as a dean for a decade.  In 2002, he was appointed interim president of the University of Michigan.  In 2003, he worked at Fred Alger Management Co., an asset management firm in New York City. He returned to Michigan where he was a faculty member in the Life Sciences Institute. In 2005, he was named president of the University of Illinois and was appointed president emeritus in 2010.  He was a faculty member of the College of Business where he was the James F. Towey Professor of Business and Leadership.  He was appointed professor emeritus of business in 2020.  He serves on the boards of directors of Gordon Food Service, M Financial and the Upjohn Institute for Employment Research.

White has written, taught and spoken extensively on leadership, management and governance. He is the author of The Nature of Leadership and Boards That Excel: Candid Insights and Practical Advice for Directors.  He was honored with the Martin Luther King Jr. Leadership Award from the Illinois Commission on Diversity and Human Relations in 2007, the Leadership Award from the Illinois Legislative Latino Caucus Foundation in 2005 and a Doctor of Humane Letters degree (honorary) from Wabash College in 2003. White is a member of Phi Beta Kappa and Beta Gamma Sigma.

Ross School of Business deanship
White served from 1990 to 2001 as dean of the University of Michigan's Ross School of Business. During his deanship, the School's MBA, BBA, and executive education programs were highly ranked. The School's endowment rose from $30 million to more than $250 million. Endowed Chairs increased from nine to thirty-nine.

White led a major MBA curriculum overhaul, which aimed to intensify the development of students' professional and practical skills. The reforms re-defined the school's image and fueled a rise in its reputation, including being named one of the two "most innovative" business school's in the nation, according to Business Week magazine's surveys of corporate executives. Michigan became known for both innovation and action learning. The core innovation, called MAP (Multidisciplinary Action Project), puts students into "live cases" inside companies for seven weeks. White likened it to a medical school residency. Michigan was the first to integrate action learning, which is today common in business schools, into the core MBA curriculum as a requirement for all students. In addition, White's curriculum reform included cutting the 14-week semesters in half and adding executive education-style skills development seminars. Other initiatives, such as research on how to supplement the GMAT with a test of "practical intelligence," helped cement the school's reputation for concerning itself as much with the real-world performance of its graduates as their intellectual development.

Among the other highlights of White's curriculum reform was the introduction of an intensive two-day community service and corporate citizenship boot camp as the kickoff of the MBA program—a first among business schools.

Under White, Michigan's African-American enrollment was the highest among the top-ranked business schools. Enrollment of under-represented minorities hovered around 14-15 percent. The School was found to be "the best business school for blacks" by The Journal of Blacks in Higher Education. He also moved to aggressively globalize the School. Most notably, he founded the William Davidson Institute to position Michigan as a leader on economies transitioning from communism to free markets.

White was an early mover on distance learning, initially creating partnerships with major companies to deliver management training to their employees. In January, 2000, White's team announced a partnership with FT Knowledge to provide open-enrollment e-learning classes.(FT Knowledge, at the time, was a division of Pearson plc, owner of the Financial Times and other major media properties.)

White built on a reputation in entrepreneurship grounded in the Michigan's long-running Growth Capital Symposium, which had started in 1981. White's team created additional opportunities for students to get venture capital and entrepreneurship experience by launching a student-run venture capital fund, called the Wolverine Venture Fund. Founded in 1997, its first investments were reported in the New York Times in 1999  and by 2004 at least one of those investments had turned into an IPO. In 1999, real estate mogul and University of Michigan Law School graduate Sam Zell joined with Ann Lurie, the widow of Zell's business partner, to provide $10 million to found the Samuel Zell & Robert H. Lurie Institute for Entrepreneurial Studies, and quickly began offering a wide array of courses, heavily oriented toward action learning.

In his second term as dean, White proclaimed that increasing female enrollment in business schools would be a top priority of his administration. This led to a major School initiative, a study of the reasons for low female enrollment at a dozen top business schools, and, ultimately a series of changes at the School. This work also ultimately led to the founding of a major new national advocacy organization, the Forte Foundation.

Under White, several of the School's other major new programs were created. In addition to the William Davidson Institute and the Zell-Lurie Institute for Entrepreneurial Studies, White also raised funds for and oversaw the creation of The Erb Institute for Sustainable Global Enterprise and The Joel D. Tauber Institute for Global Operations. His administration launched Michigan's first Executive MBA program and built Sam Wyly Hall, a new home for the school's highly ranked executive education programs.

White served as interim president of the University of Michigan in 2002. In January 2005 the board of regents recognized him as dean emeritus of the Stephen M. Ross School of Business and professor emeritus of business administration.

University of Illinois presidency 
White was named the sixteenth president of the University of Illinois in 2004, succeeding retiring president James J. Stukel. As president, White oversaw the three campuses in the University of Illinois system—Urbana-Champaign, Chicago, and Springfield. (In the University of Illinois system, each campus is headed by a chancellor. Each chancellor reports to the president.)

White took office on January 31, 2005. He was inaugurated on September 22, 2005. In fiscal year 2010, the University of Illinois budget was $4.6 billion. In his inaugural address, White proposed a new "compact" among five parties - the state, tuition payers and their families, donors, faculty members with research grants and contracts, and university leaders – all doing their parts to provide the resources needed to ensure what he termed "excellence and access." In his first year, White initiated a strategic planning process for the university, its three campuses and their colleges and departments. On June 1, 2007, White announced the $2.25 billion Brilliant Futures fundraising campaign. By August 31, 2009, the campaign had achieved 76% of its goal with 72% of the campaign period elapsed.

White championed the establishment of the University of Illinois Global Campus Partnership, an initiative to make University of Illinois programs and degrees available online to qualified students. Following an extensive shared governance process with faculty on the three campuses, Global Campus launched in January 2008 with a bachelor's degree-completion program for registered nurses and a master's degree and two graduate certificate programs in education with concentrations in e-learning, and 15 more degree and certificate programs in development. On White's recommendation to the Board of Trustees, the Global Campus Partnership was terminated in 2009 due to an inadequate number of programs and students. Responsibility for on-line education was assigned to the university's campuses and colleges.

In February 2007 the University of Illinois Board of Trustees announced an end to the Urbana-Champaign campus tradition of Chief Illiniwek. White supported the board's decision saying, "While I understand many people have strong feelings about this 80-year-old tradition, for the good of our student-athletes and our university it is time to come together and move on to the next chapter in the history of this distinguished institution."

Honors 
While serving as president, White was honored with the Leadership Award (December 2005) from the Illinois Legislative Latino Caucus Foundation and the Dr. Martin Luther King, Jr. Excellence in Leadership Award (January 2007) from the Illinois Commission on Diversity and Human Relations. He served as a board member of the American Council on Education, the National Merit Honor Scholarship Program and the Argonne National Laboratory.

Clout scandal 

A controversy over admissions practices ended White's presidency. The University of Illinois clout scandal resulted in most members of the university's board of trustees resigning and new members being appointed by Governor Pat Quinn. The controversy erupted when Chicago Tribune reported on May 29, 2009, that several students had been admitted to the university based upon connections or recommendations by members of the board of trustees, politicians, and members of the administration of former Illinois Governor Rod Blagojevich. The controversy centered on the university's Urbana-Champaign campus, headed by Chancellor Richard Herman, who was heavily implicated in the improprieties along with the university's board of trustees. According to the article, some students were being admitted despite having sub-par qualifications. Drawing on documents obtained under the Freedom of Information Act, the Tribune said that, "The records chronicle a shadow admissions system in which some students won spots at the state's most prestigious public university over the protests of admissions officers, while others had their rejections reversed during an unadvertised appeal process." The investigation revealed that approximately 800 students over five years landed on the so-called "clout list" and, though not all were unworthy, the admission rate of these students was eight percentage points higher than the school average.

In response to the articles, White quickly launched an overhaul of the admissions process. As the university faculty-student senate prepared to vote on whether to call for White's removal, he appeared before the group and told them, "I stood behind every admissions denial, no matter who the advocates or how persistent they were." Nevertheless, the faculty-student senate passed a resolution on September 14 calling for his removal, along with that of the chancellor of the University of Illinois at Urbana-Champaign, the campus that was at the center of the admissions controversy.

On September 23, 2009, he announced his resignation as president, effective December 31, 2009. In his resignation letter, White said he wanted to give the reconstituted Board of Trustees the freedom to choose new leadership. Saying he was sensitive to the financial sacrifices being made by faculty and staff due to difficult economic times, White timed his resignation to free the University of its obligation to pay him a $475,000 retention bonus that would have been due in February.

Although the Admissions Review Commission did not call for White's removal, the commission's chairman, Judge Abner J. Mikva said that the situation had become impossible for White. In public session at his final Board of Trustees meeting on November 12, 2009, White shared a letter he received from Judge Mikva dated September 24, 2009. Judge Mikva wrote: "I was sad to learn that you are resigning as President of the University. Everything that came out during the investigation by the University of Illinois Admissions Review Commission that I headed indicated that you always had the best interests of the University as the basis for your actions. You are a person of great integrity and worthy of great respect." The Chicago Tribune quoted the Board of Trustees' new chairman, Christopher Kennedy, as saying, "He (White) is a class act, and I think his decision today will contribute to his reputation."

References

External links 
 LinkedIn: Connect with B. Joseph White
 Boards That Excel: Candid Insights and Practical Advice for Directors
 Official Biography, University of Illinois
 University of Illinois Global Campus

1947 births
Living people
Leaders of the University of Illinois
Harvard Business School alumni
People from Columbus, Indiana
People from Detroit
People from Urbana, Illinois
Presidents of the University of Michigan
Ross School of Business faculty
Ross School of Business alumni
Walsh School of Foreign Service alumni
University of Michigan alumni